The Waterloo Festival for Animated Cinema (WFAC) was an annual international film festival for animated feature films, held in Waterloo, Ontario, Canada. It ran for 13 years, from 2001 to 2013.

The festival was unique in its focus on feature animation.  Its selection of films suggested a desire to create bridges: from audience to animator, from anime to non-anime, and most obviously from mature audiences to mature films, which simply happen to be animated.  The programme was also surprisingly comprehensive - in its first year the festival was dedicated mainly to anime, but it later became much more international.  Perhaps reflecting its focus, WFAC has presented more animated feature films in public exhibition than any other festival in the world.

One interesting development since 2003 was the festival's Tidbits programme, developed to search out and promote the creation of feature films by one single artist or very small groups, made possible by advancements in technology.

Festival history

2013
World Cinema selections: Canadian/North American/International premieres of AninA (Alfredo Soderguit, 2013), L'Arte della Felicità (The Art of Happiness - Alessandro Rak, 2013), Até que a Sbórnia nos Separe (Til Sbornia Do Us Part - Otto Guerra, 2013), Uma História de Amor e Fúria (Rio 2096: A Story of Love and Fury - Luiz Bolognesi, 2013); also Ernest et Celestine (Ernest and Celestine - Stéphane Aubier, Vincent Patar, Benjamin Renner, 2012), ベルセルク 黄金時代篇 (Berserk: The Golden Age Arc trilogy - Toshiyuki Kubooka, 2012–13), Ma Maman est en Amérique, Elle a Rencontré Buffalo Bill (My Mummy is in America, and She Met Buffalo Bill - Marc Boréal, Thibaut Chatel, 2013), Couleur de Peau: Miel (Approved for Adoption - Jung Henin and Laurent Boileau, 2012), The Congress (Ari Folman, 2013), 009 RE:CYBORG (Kamiyama Kenji, 2012), Persistence of Vision (Kevin Schreck, 2012).

2012
World Cinema selections: Canadian/North American/International premieres of Asura (Sato Keiichi, 2012), Az ember tragédiája (The Tragedy of Man - Marcell Jankovics, 2012), Crulic - drumul spre dincolo (Crulic - The Path to Beyond - Anca Damian, 2011), Heart String Marionette (M dot Strange, 2012), Jensen & Jensen (Craig Frank, 2011), Le Jour des Corneilles (The Day of the Crows - Jean Christophe Dessaint, 2012), Marco Macaco (Jan Rahbek, 2012), Strange Frame (G.B. Hajim, 2012), チベット犬物語 (Tibetan Dog - Kojima Masayuki, 2012), 図書館戦争 ~ 革命のつばさ (Library War: The Wings of Revolution - Hamana Takayuki, 2012), 虹色ほたる (Rainbow Fireflies - Uda Kounosuke, 2012); also Babeldom (Paul Bush, 2012), Blood-C: The Last Dark (Shiotani Naoyoshi, 2012), おおかみこどもの雨と雪 (Wolf Children - Hosoda Mamoru, 2012), ももへの手紙 (A Letter To Momo - Okiura Hiroyuki, 2011), ヘルズ (Hells - Yamakawa Yoshiki, 2008),

Tidbits selection: Canadian/North American/International premieres of Anime Mirai - including Juju the Weightless Dugong (Kawamata Hiroshi, 2012), Pretending Not to See (Miyashita Shinpei, 2012), Li'l Spider Girl (Kaiya Toshihisa, 2012), Buta (Tomonaga, Kazuhide, 2012).

2011
World Cinema: Canadian/North American/International premieres of Green Days (Han Hye-jin, An Jae-hoon, 2011), 마당을 나온 암탉 (Leafie, A Hen into the Wild - Oh Seongyun, 2011), Adventures in Plymptoons! (Alexia Anastasio, 2011), Den kæmpestore bjørn (The Great Bear - Esben Toft Jacobsen, 2011), FIMFÁRUM – DO TŘETICE VŠEHO DOBRÉHO (Fimfárum - Third Time Lucky - Kristina Dufková, Vlasta Pospíšilová, David Súkup, 2011).  Also Chico y Rita (Chico and Rita - Tono Errando, Javier Mariscal, Fernando Trueba, 2010), とある飛空士への追憶 (The Princess and the Pilot - Jun Shishido, 2011), 鋼の錬金術師 嘆きの丘（ミロス）の聖なる星 (Fullmetal Alchemist: The Sacred Star of Milos - Murata Kazuya, 2011), El Sol (The Sun - Ayar Blasco, 2011).

2010
World Cinema: Canadian/North American/International premieres of Piercing I (Liu Jian, 2009), ГАДКИЙ УТЕНОК (The Ugly Duckling - Garri Bardin, 2010), Duga (The Rainbow - Joška Marušića, 2010), ՍԱՍՆԱ ԾՌԵՐ (Daredevils of Sasun -- Arman Manaryan, 2010), Trigun: Badlands Rumble (Yasuko Kobayashi, 2010), 仏陀再誕 (The Rebirth of Buddha - Takaaki Ishiyama, 2009); also Redline (Takeshi Koike, 2010), Gravity Was Everywhere Back Then (Brent Green, 2010), Goodbye Mr. Christie (Phil Mulloy, 2010), NA PŮDĚ ANEB KDO MÁ DNESKA NAROZENINY? (In the Attic: Who Has a Birthday Today? - Jiří Barta, 2011), 夏日大作战 (Summer Wars - Mamoru Hosoda, 2010), Surviving Life (Theory and Practice) (Jan Švankmajer, 2010).

2009

Retrospective screenings: СМЕХ И ГОРЕ У БЕЛА МОРЯ (Laughter and Grief by the White Sea - Leonid Nosyrev, 1989); ТИГРЁНОК НА ПОДСОЛНУХЕ (The Little Tiger on the Sunflower - Leonid Nosyrev, 1981); ПРОПАВШАЯ ГРАМОТА (The Lost Letter - Valentina and Zinaida Brumberg, Lamis Bredis, 1945); КРАДЕНОЕ СОЛНЦЕ (The Stolen Sun - Ivan Ivanov-Vano, Olga Khodatayeva, 1943); СЛОН И МОСЬКА (The Elephant and the Pug - Pantaleymon Sazonov, Lamis Bredis, 1941); КОШКА, КОТОРАЯ ГУЛЯЛА САМА ПО СЕБЕ (The Cat Who Walked by Herself - Ideya Garanina, 1988)

Tidbits selections: Panique au Village (Stéphane Aubier and Vincent Patar, 2009)

World Cinema: Canadian/North American/International premieres of Rebuild of Evangelion 2.0: You Can (Not) Advance (Hideaki Anno, 2009), Alisa's Birthday (Seregin Sergey, 2009), First Squad: the Moment of Truth (Yoshiharu Ashino, 2009), L.A. Dolce Vita (Gábor Csupo, 2008), 宮本武蔵 ―双剣に馳せる夢― (Musashi: the Dream of the Last Samurai, Mizuho Nishikubo, 2009), ПРО ФЕДОТА-СТРЕЛЬЦА, УДАЛОГО МОЛОДЦА (Fedot the Hunter - Ludmilla Steblyanko, 2009), Technotise: Edit & I (Aleksa Gajic, 2009), Boogie, el Aceitoso (Gustavo Cova, 2009); also Mary and Max (Adam Elliot, 2009), Brendan and The Secret of Kells  (Tomm Moore, Nora Twomey, 2009), and Metropia (Tarik Saleh, 2009).

2008

Retrospective screenings: Die Abenteuer des Prinzen Achmed (The Adventures of Prince Achmed - Lotte Reiniger, 1926) from restored 35 mm print, with live score composed and performed by Miles and Karina; 20th anniversary screening of Hotaru no Haka (Grave of the Fireflies - Isao Takahata, 1988) from 35 mm print, with Frederik Schodt, Brian Ruh, John O'Donnell leading discussion

Tidbits selections: Sita Sings The Blues (Nina Paley, 2008), We Are the Strange (M dot Strange, 2007), Idiots and Angels (Bill Plympton, 2008), From Inside (John Bergin, 2008)

World Cinema: Canadian/North American/International premieres of Piano no Mori (The Piano Forest - Masayuki Kojima, 2007), Rebuild of Evangelion 1.0: You Are (Not) Alone (Hideaki Anno, 2007), Egon és Dönci (Egon and Dönci) (Ádám Magyar, 2008), Donkey Xote (Jose Pozo, 2008), Summer Days With Coo (Keiichi Hara, 2007), Only Love (Lev Polyakov, 2008), Quirino Cristiani: the Mystery of the First Animated Movies (Gabriele Zuccelli, 2008); also Genius Party (various, 2007), Genius Party Beyond (various, 2008), and Nocturna (Victor Maldonado/Adriá García, 2007)

2007

Retrospective screenings: Canadian/North American premiere of Rocky and Hudson

Tidbits selections: Canadian/North American/International premieres of Black Ceiling, Five Centimeters Per Second, The Killer of Montmartre, Anna and the Moods, SOS Metro Tokyo Explorers

World Cinema: Canadian/North American/International premieres of The Pixar Story, RH+: the Vampiress of Seville, Flatland, One Night in One City, Wood & Stock: Sex, Oregano and Rock 'n Roll; also Aachi and Ssipak, The Ugly Duckling and Me, Film Noir, Free Jimmy

2006

Retrospective screenings: Princes and Princesses

Titbits selections: various

World Cinema: Canadian/North American/International premieres of Origin: Spirits of the Past, Fimfárum 2, Fire Ball, Khan Kluay, Pettson and Findus: Pettson's Promise, Prince Vladimir, Dobrynia Nikitich, The Girl Who Leapt Through Time; also Princess, The Book of the Dead, Robotech: The Shadow Chronicles, Blood Tea and Red String

2005

World Cinema: Canadian/North American/International premieres of Alosha Popovich i Tugarin Zmey, Fragile Machine, A Place Promised in Our Early Days, Terkel in Trouble; also Frank and Wendy, Mind Game, The District, Strings, Winter Days

2004

Retrospective screenings: Rock & Rule

Tidbits: various

World Cinema: Canadian/North American/International premieres of Appleseed, McDull: Prince de la Bun, Oseam, Y Mabinogi, La Prophétie des Grenouilles, Karlik Nos; also Steamboy, Kaena, The Legend of the Sky Kingdom, Hair High

2003

Retrospective screenings: Laputa: Castle in the Sky, Utena, Perfect Blue, Escaflowne

Tidbits: various

World Cinema: Canadian/North American/International premieres of Mari Iyagi, WXIII Patlabor, My Life as McDull, Princess Arête, Corto Maltese, Wonderful Days, Officer Down, Missing Persons; also Princes and Princesses

2002

World Cinema: Canadian/North American premieres of Cowboy Bebop, A Tree of Palme; also Spirited Away, Spriggan

2001

World Cinema: Canadian premieres of Vampire Hunter D: Bloodlust, Metropolis, Jin-Roh: The Wolf Brigade

See also
List of animated feature-length films
Ottawa International Animation Festival

External links

Contact information
In-depth article about festival (November 2008)
WFAC group on Facebook

Animation film festivals in Canada
Film festivals in Ontario
Festivals in the Regional Municipality of Waterloo
Film festivals established in 2001
Defunct film festivals in Canada